In number theory, Moessner's theorem or Moessner's magic
The algorithm was first published by Alfred Moessner in 1951; the first proof of its validity was given by Oskar Perron that same year.

Construction
Write down every positive integer and remove every -th element, with  a positive integer. Build a new sequence of partial sums with the remaining numbers. Continue by removing every -st element in the new sequence and producing a new sequence of partial sums. For the sequence , remove the -st elements and produce a new sequence of partial sums.

The procedure stops at the -th sequence. The remaining sequence will correspond to

Example 
The initial sequence is the sequence of positive integers,

For , we remove every fourth number from the sequence of integers and add up each element to the sum of the previous elements 

Now we remove every third element and continue to add up the partial sums

Remove every second element and continue to add up the partial sums

,
which recovers .

Variants 
If the triangular numbers are removed instead, a similar procedure leads to the sequence of factorials

References

External links 

 

Number theory